Nadia Shahram, is a mediation attorney, author, activist, and advocate for women's rights. She is the founder and president of The Coalition for the Advancement of Moslem Women, an organization promoting equality for Muslim women. Shahram unveiled the first Declaration of Equalities for Muslim Women during the 2014 Convention Days in Seneca Falls, New York. One year later, Shahram presented the Declaration to the Women's Rights National Historical Park in Seneca Falls, where it hangs on permanent display in the Visitor's Center.

Shahram is a board member of the Family Justice Center of Erie County, a member of the Women's Bar Association of the State of New York, and a board member of the New York State Council of Divorce Mediation.

Early life

Shahram was born in Tehran, Iran. She was one of six daughters. Her parents had an extensive library and as a child she was encouraged to read the classics. Her father was an activist for civil and human rights. He was jailed by the Secret Police (SAVAK) for his outspoken views, and Shahram vividly recalls her father being taken from their home in the middle of the night.

Transition to America

Shahram traveled to the United States with the ambition of becoming a broadcast journalist. She received her B.S. in Business Administration in 1988 and her J.D. in 1997 from the State University of New York at Buffalo. During these years Shahram married and had two daughters.

Career

After receiving her law degree, Shahram trained as a family mediator at the Rochester Mediation Center and has been a practicing mediator in the field of Matrimonial Mediation since 2001. Her inspiration for focusing her legal practice on matrimonial mediation came after observing and studying alternative dispute resolution methods, especially the success of family mediation as practiced in European and Asian countries.

Shahram was an adjunct professor in the Law and Government Program at Hilbert College from 2001 through 2007. She continues to teach as an adjunct professor at the Buffalo State University Law School. She regularly organizes and chairs conferences and symposiums on Divorce Mediation in western New York.

Community service

Through The Coalition for the Advancement of Moslem Women, Shahram and her organization sponsor initiatives intended to stimulate economic empowerment of refugee women offering opportunities to gain the entrepreneurial skills crucial for self-sufficiency and generate some income to eventually support their families.  Other community projects include an annual scholarship awarded to a promising young Moslem lady to pursue her education goals and several partnerships with other regional relief agencies to provide the refugee and immigrant communities with basic necessities, from mattresses to crisis counseling.

Awards and recognition

Shahram has received awards for her contributions to the community, including “Women of Influence” from Business First, and the “Legal Elite” Award of Western New York in 2013. Shahram is the founding member of “Raising Hope”, an annual fashion show fund-raiser to benefit the Family Justice Center. During the years 2012 through 2014 this project raised over $100,000 for women victimized by domestic violence in the Western New York area.

Activism

After the events of September 11, 2001, Shahram re-examined her faith of Islam, the role of Muslims in the international arena, and the perceptions of Islam in the West. She later developed a course at the University of Buffalo Law School, "The Effects of Religion and Culture on Family Laws." Shahram is a critic of the inequality and misogyny in Muslim culture and frequently writes op-eds and letters-to-the-Editors.

Declaration of Equalities for Moslem Women
Shahram unveiled the first Declaration of Equalities for Moslem Women on July 19, 2014, during Convention Days in Seneca Falls, New York. Seneca Falls Convention is the birthplace of the women's rights movement, where the first Women's Rights Convention was held in 1848.

Shahram's Declaration is written in the spirit of Elizabeth Cady Stanton (a “calls to arms for female equality”) and aspires to address laws and cultural practices which are unjust, and discriminatory to women in Islamic countries. Shahram's goal is to raise one million signatures and present the Declaration to the United Nations. Once presented, the goal is to encourage the UN to assist in gender equalization in Muslim countries in the courts.

Shahram has a number of small groups of graduate students making ongoing presentations throughout the New York State University system informing and securing additional signatures on the Declaration. Shahram herself continues to promote the Declaration and educate people around the State of New York. She made an artistic presentation of the Declaration at the “Declaration of Sentiments: The Remix, A Celebration of the 200th Birthday of Elizabeth Cady Stanton and the Women’s Suffrage Centennial” on November 12, 2015, and another presentation at the High Falls Film Festival in High Falls, NY on November 15, 2015.

Media

While visiting her native country of Iran in 2004 and 2005, Shahram conducted hundreds of interviews and attended Islamic courtrooms as part of a research project. Shortly after Shahram returned from her trip she was the focus of a feature article in the Hilbert College quarterly “Connections” Magazine. Shahram published her first novel, "Marriage on the Street Corners of Tehran” in 2010. This book was based on research and the true stories of Iranian women, with whom she conducted interviews during her time in Iran, and who shared in detail their experiences.

As an expert in Family law and Islam, Shahram has been interviewed by local as well as national radio and TV stations, and numerous print media sources.

Shahram lectures and gives presentations across New York State  and is often interviewed by media sources for her informed opinion. She contributes frequently to the Buffalo News, the Erie County Bar Association newsletter and other regional publications.

References 

American Muslims
Year of birth missing (living people)
Living people
Hilbert College faculty